Crambus hamella is a species of moth in the family Crambidae described by Carl Peter Thunberg in 1788. It is found in most of Europe (except the Iberian Peninsula and most of the Balkan Peninsula), east to the Russian Far East (Amur, Sakhalin) and Japan. It is also found in North America, including Alberta, Arizona, Manitoba, Michigan, Oklahoma and Ontario.

The wingspan is 18–23 mm. The forewings with apex slightly produced; brown, posteriorly whitish-sprinkled, terminally suffused with white ; a broad snow - white pointed median longitudinal streak from base, not reaching second
line, lower edge with a projection in middle ; second line angulated, silvery - white, anteriorly dark-edged ; a triangular white subapical spot ; several terminal longitudinal black marks ; cilia metallic. Hindwings are grey..

Adults are on wing from July to August in generation per year.

The larvae feed on grasses, possibly including Deschampsia flexuosa.

Subspecies
Crambus hamella hamella (Eurasia)
Crambus hamella carpenterellus Packard, 1874 (North America)

References

Moths described in 1788
Crambini
Moths of Asia
Moths of Europe
Moths of North America